Konishchevo is a rural locality (a village) in Gorodetskoye Rural Settlement, Kichmengsko-Gorodetsky District, Vologda Oblast, Russia. The population was 7 as of 2002.

Geography 
Konishchevo is located 14 km southwest of Kichmengsky Gorodok (the district's administrative centre) by road. Zagarye is the nearest rural locality.

References 

Rural localities in Kichmengsko-Gorodetsky District